Royal Air Force Bawtry or more simply RAF Bawtry is a former Royal Air Force station located at Bawtry Hall in Bawtry, South Yorkshire, England and was No. 1 Group RAF Bomber Command headquarters and administration unit during and following the Second World War. 

The site is currently being used as a Luxury Wedding Venue, working with the Crown Hotel in Bawtry

History 
Bawtry Hall itself is a large redbrick house in two storeys with attics which was erected around 1785 by Pemberton Milnes, a prosperous wool-merchant from Wakefield, Yorkshire. It descended in the Milnes family for several generations before being sold to Major George Peake, a well-known amateur pilot, in 1905. It is a Grade II* listed building.

During the Second World War the RAF took it over and it became an RAF command centre. RAF Bawtry did not have its own airfield but instead took advantage of RAF Bircotes, which was located literally next-door. Here the station based a number of communications aircraft.

Bawtry Hall served the Royal Air Force from 1941–1984; first as HQ for No. 1 Group, Bomber Command during and after the Second World War, then as HQ No. 1 Group as part of Strike Command up to and including the later stages of the Cold War. The famous bombing of the airfield at Port Stanley by Vulcan bombers from RAF Waddington during the Falklands War was co-ordinated from the operations room at Bawtry Hall.

RAF Bawtry became the centre of the RAF Meteorological Service for many years and ceased military operations in 1986.  In June 1987 Bawtry Hall was purchased by The Welbeck Estate Group.

No. 1 Group Bomber Command units based at RAF Bawtry comprised as follows: –

+data from:

During the Miners' Strike in the mid-1980s, police officers were based at RAF Bawtry to provide a central Operations and co-ordination point on the South Yorkshire / Nottinghamshire border.

Present 

The Air Training Corps 2008 Squadron is still located at the former site on Park Road in Bawtry, in a new building that replaced the former ones.

It was sold by Defence Estates in the mid 1980s to a Roger Byron-Collins company who owned Bawtry Hall for 3 years together with the nearby technical and domestic site at RAF Hemswell and the post war married quarters sites at RAF Finningley and RAF Scampton. Later the building was bought by Action Partners Corporation, a Christian organisation, and has been used as teaching and conference centre for the past 24 years.

The trustees had taken the decision to close the hall on 31 December 2013 and a buyer was being actively sought. The hall was sold in 2014 for £1.6 million to Bawtry Hall properties who would be moving various video gaming enterprises into the building.

See also
List of former Royal Air Force stations
Grade II* listed buildings in South Yorkshire
Listed buildings in Bawtry

References

Citations

Bibliography

Royal Air Force stations in Yorkshire
Aviation in Doncaster
Royal Air Force stations of World War II in the United Kingdom
Bawtry
Grade II* listed buildings in South Yorkshire